The Ditty Bops were an American band from Los Angeles, California that began with Warner Brothers, and later self-produced recordings. Noted for their tight vocal harmonies by Abby DeWald and Amanda Barrett. They incorporated a variety of musical styles such as folk, bluegrass, blues, western swing, ragtime and musical theater with guitar, ukulele, mandolin and dulcimer. Their live shows were often very interactive, and had different themes and theatrical elements complete with props, costumes, skits, and amusing slide shows.

History 

Romantically involved since 1999, DeWald and Barrett met in New York City and formed The Ditty Bops years later after a hunt for a neighbor's lost cat. When they unwittingly crossed into the backyard of a stranger, they discovered that he was a musician and an avid guitar collector. He encouraged them to form a band and start playing.

Their music has been on the ABC show Grey's Anatomy, including "There's a Girl," which is featured on the show's soundtrack CD. The band has also appeared on The L Word.

The Ditty Bops have appeared twice on Prairie Home Companion with Garrison Keillor: May 7, 2005 from Mitchell, South Dakota and June 18, 2005, from Highland Park, Illinois.

From May 23 through September 2, 2006, the Ditty Bops embarked on a cross-country tour by bicycle to promote the release of their second album, Moon Over the Freeway, while advocating a call-to-action about pollution and energy conservation. They traveled from Los Angeles to New York City, logging 4,502.75 miles.

In October 2008, Abby and Amanda announced their marriage in California via an e-mail message to their fans and MySpace Blog.

Discography
 The Ditty Bops (CD) – Warner Bros. Records – 2004
 Moon Over The Freeway (CD) – Warner Bros. Records – 2006
 Pack Rat (EP) – Ditty Bops Music – 2007
 Summer Rains (CD) – Ditty Bops Music – 2008
 Songs for Steve (EP) – Ditty Bops Music – 2009
 The Color Album (EP) – Ditty Bops Music – 2010
 Love Letters (CD) – Ditty Bops Music – 2011
 Jelly for President - Yes We Jam (CD) – Ditty Bops Music – 2011

References

External links
 Official Facebook Page -For most current news and info from the band itself
 The Ditty Bops at The Rock Hard Times, comprehensive discography, music videos, mp3s
 The Ditty Bops collection at the Internet Archive's live music archive
 Interview with music from The Ditty Bops
 The Ditty Bops on Last.fm
 Interview with Amanda Barrett on Sepiachord

Interviews
ThoughtWorthy Media Interview with The Ditty Bops (38:04)
The Advocate: "Gotta have my Bops"
"Folkscene", 2005-11-13, KPFK

American folk musical groups
American bluegrass music groups
All-female bands
Musical groups from Los Angeles
LGBT-themed musical groups
Musical groups established in 2004
Folk music duos
American musical duos
Female musical duos
2004 establishments in California